Gazabad-e Manuchehri (also Romanized as Gazābād-e Manūchehrī; also known as Gazābād and Qātemīyeh) is a village in Hoseynabad Rural District, Esmaili District, Anbarabad County, Kerman Province, Iran. At the 2006 census, its population was 46, in 11 families.

References 

Populated places in Anbarabad County